The European Railway Award was initiated in 2007 and is jointly organised by the Community of European Railway and Infrastructure Companies (CER), and the Union des Industries Ferroviaires Européennes, the Association of the European Rail Industry (UNIFE).

Award ceremony and annual reception 

The European Railway Award honours outstanding political and technical achievements in the development of economically and environmentally sustainable rail transport. The award is held annually in Brussels with over 500 participants. The award includes prize money, which is donated to the charitable organizations of the laureates’ choice. The jury consists of CEOs of rail companies and other stakeholders from the transport sector. Siim Kallas, Vice-President of the European Commission, and Brian Simpson, Member of the European Parliament and Chairman of the Transport Committee, are regular guests of honour of the European Railway Award. The Award Ceremony is always followed by the joint CER-UNIFE Annual Reception.

Prior to 2018, a political and technical award were given out to two recipients, but these awards were merged in 2018. In 2017, for the tenth anniversary of the award, no awards were given out.

Award recipients (2017-)

Political award recipients (2007-2016) 

The political award was given to personalities who have contributed to the development of economically and environmentally sustainable rail transport in their countries and in Europe.

Technical award recipients (2007-2016) 

The Technical Award was given to personalities who have contributed to the design of breakthrough solutions and technologies in the rail sector.

Links 

European Railway Award

Press review 

 European Voice, Prestigious awards at the European railways industry annual reception, European Voice, 28 February 2013.
 Henri Borzi, European Railway Award 2013 assigned, BrusselsDiplomatic, 27 February 2013.
 Railway Gazette International, Awards encourage European railway integration, Railway Gazette International, 9 February 2012.
 De Standaard, Railway Award, 9 February 2012.
The Parliament Magazine, Commissioner says railways have 'crucial' role in tackling climate change, The Parliament Magazine, 17 February 2011.
 Transport Business International, Rail sector celebrates European Railway Award, Transport Business International, 2011.
Railway Gazette International, Kallas calls for change at European Railway Award, Railway Gazette International, 10 February 2011.
 Global Rail News, Ken Livingstone and Stefan Haas receive European Railway Award, Global Railway News, 10 February 2011.
 EurActiv, EU 'wise men' chief wants more rail, less road, EurActiv, 5 February 2010.

References 

Rail transport industry awards
Awards established in 2007
Rail transport in Europe